Templemania rhythmogramma is a species of moth of the family Tortricidae. It is found in Zacualpan, Mexico.

References

Moths described in 1924
Atteriini